Douglas Sloan may refer to:

 Douglas Sloan (filmmaker), American documentary filmmaker
 Douglas M. Sloan, professor of history and education at Teachers College, Columbia University